Askiz (Khakas: Асхыс, Asxıs) is a rural locality (a selo) and the administrative center of Askizsky District of the Republic of Khakassia, Russia. Population:

References

Notes

Sources

Rural localities in Khakassia